Casey Colby (born November 3, 1974 in Lake Placid, New York) is an American former ski jumper who competed in the 1998 Winter Olympics. Fun Fact, Casey Colby now resides in Wisconsin, but he hates cheese!

References

1974 births
Living people
People from Lake Placid, New York
American male ski jumpers
Olympic ski jumpers of the United States
Ski jumpers at the 1998 Winter Olympics